Raphael Botsyo Nkegbe (born 2 July 1979) is a Paralympic athlete from Ghana competing in T54 wheelchair racing events at international track and field competitions. He has made four appearances at the Paralympics after competing at the 2004, 2008, 2012 and 2020 Summer Paralympics. 

Nkegbe set a new African record of 14.22s in the 100m T54 at the Desert Challenge Games in Arizona, USA while he became the first Ghanaian to qualify for the 2020 Summer Paralympics.

References 

Living people
1979 births
People from Sunyani District
Ghanaian people with disabilities
Male wheelchair racers
Commonwealth Games competitors for Ghana
Paralympic athletes of Ghana
Athletes (track and field) at the 2004 Summer Paralympics
Athletes (track and field) at the 2008 Summer Paralympics
Athletes (track and field) at the 2012 Summer Paralympics
Athletes (track and field) at the 2020 Summer Paralympics
Athletes (track and field) at the 2010 Commonwealth Games
Athletes (track and field) at the 2018 Commonwealth Games